Dark Legend may refer to:

 Dark Legend (novel), by American author Christine Feehan
 Dark Legend (video game)
 Overlord: Dark Legend, an action role-playing game